Sieroszewice  is a village in Ostrów Wielkopolski County, Greater Poland Voivodeship, in west-central Poland. It is the seat of the gmina (administrative district) called Gmina Sieroszewice.

The village has a population of 1,014.

References

Sieroszewice